Jar-Bashy is a village in Osh Region of Kyrgyzstan. It is part of the Chong-Alay District. Its population was 2,798 in 2021.

References

External links 
Satellite map at Maplandia.com

Populated places in Osh Region